Khaleej Sirte is a Libyan football club based in Sirte, Libya. They play in the Libyan Premier League. They play their home matches at the 2 March Stadium in Sirte. The stadium holds around 2,000 people.

History
Sirte was founded on 5 May 1963. It continued under this name, and on 29 July 1999, the two other clubs in Sirte, Al-Najm Al-Sate and Al-Intilaaq, merged to form Khaleej Sirte

Recent years
Having gained promotion to the Premier League in 2005–06, they managed to stay up in their first season, achieving a respectable 7th-place finish. They finished 5th in 2007–08, and manager Abdulhafeedh Arbeesh managed to guide the club to their first pieces of silverware, the Libyan League Cup and the Libyan Cup, after a 1–0 win over Madina.

They therefore gained qualification to the 2009 CAF Confederation Cup. After a 6–0 aggregate win over Tanzanian side Prisons FC in the first round, they were handed a tricky draw against Algerian giants ES Sétif. Having been narrowly defeated 1–0 in the home leg, they were crushed 5–0 in Sétif, as they bowed out to the eventual finalists. In the 2008 North African Cup Winners Cup, they were defeated 4–0 on aggregate by Moroccan side Maghreb Fez.

Despite another top half finish in 2008–09, Arbeesh left to join Hilal, and Tunisian Tariq Thabit joined from Wefaq Sabratha. New signings Hussein al Idrissy, Tariq al Aqrabi, Mehdi ben Nsira and Maher Nayili led the side to a top three finish in 2009–10, and Thabit's contract was renewed for a second year.

Achievements
Libyan Football Cup: 1
2008

Libyan SuperCup: 0
Runners-up: 2008

Libyan League Cup: 1
2008

CAF Competitions
CAF Confederation Cup: 1 appearance
2009 – First Round

Current squad
2009–10 season

Coaching staff

Football clubs in Libya
1963 establishments in Libya
Association football clubs established in 1963